Robert Harrison Smith (1848 – 11 November 1911) was a member of both the Queensland Legislative Council and the Queensland Legislative Assembly.

Early life
Smith was born in 1848 at Castleblayney, County Monaghan, Ireland to John Smith and his wife Mary (née Monaghan). He was educated at local schools before attending Queen's College, Belfast. He worked as an auctioneer and after his arrival in Queensland, Australia, was a member of the Queensland Garrison Artillery.

Political career
At the 1888 colonial election, Smith successfully stood for the seat of Bowen, defeating Mr Collings. He held the seat for fourteen years before retiring at the 1902 state election.

Two years later, Smith was appointed by premier Arthur Morgan to the Queensland Legislative Council, remaining there until his death in 1911.

Personal life
In 1889, Smith married Ada Cecil Fulchier at Sydney and together had 2 children. He died in November 1911, and was buried in Toowong Cemetery.

References

Members of the Queensland Legislative Assembly
Members of the Queensland Legislative Council
Burials at Toowong Cemetery
1848 births
1911 deaths